The following lists events that happened in 1989 in Iceland.

Incumbents
President – Vigdís Finnbogadóttir 
Prime Minister – Steingrímur Hermannsson

Events

Births

8 January – Kristján Einar, racing driver
1 February – Alfreð Finnbogason, footballer
10 March – Brynjar Guðmundsson, alpine skier.
31 March – Valgerður Þóroddsdóttir, poet and publisher
22 April – Aron Gunnarsson, footballer
18 September – Anníe Mist Þórisdóttir, CrossFit athlete

Deaths
13 March – Haukur Óskarsson, footballer (b. 1915)
16 April – Brynjólfur Bjarnason, politician (b. 1898)

Full date missing 
 Jón Gunnar Árnason, sculptor (b. 1931)
 Ragnar Kjartansson, sculptor (b. 1923)

References

 
1980s in Iceland
Iceland
Iceland
Years of the 20th century in Iceland